Ilias Sebaoui (born 4 October 2001) is a professional footballer who plays as an attacking midfielder for Belgian First Division A club Beerschot. Born in Belgium, Sebaoui is a youth international for Morocco.

Club career
Sebaoui began playing football with the academy of Beerschot A.C. at the age of 8, before a stint with Waasland-Beveren in 2013. In 2015, he moved to the newly formed Beerschot academy and worked his way up their youth categories often as the captain of these sides. On 27 October 2021, he debuted with Beerschot in a 4–0 Belgian Cup win over Francs Borains. On 6 February 2022, Sebaoui signed his first professional contract with Beerschot until 2025.

International career
Born in Belgium, Sebaoui is of Moroccan descent. He was called up to a training camp for the Morocco U23s in March 2022. He was then called up to the Belgium U21s for 2023 UEFA European Under-21 Championship qualification matches in June 2022. He opted to represent the Morocco U23s on 27 May 2022, for a set of friendlies with the team.

References

External links
 
 

2001 births
Living people
Footballers from Antwerp
Moroccan footballers
Morocco youth international footballers
Belgian footballers
Belgian sportspeople of Moroccan descent
Association football midfielders
K Beerschot VA players
Belgian Pro League players